GATC may refer to:

Girish and The Chronicles, Indian rock band.
Georgia Appalachian Trail Club
GATC Generic ATC
GATC (gene), a gene encoding Glutamyl-tRNA(Gln) amidotransferase, subunit C homolog (bacterial).